Sir Hugh Cholmeley, 4th Baronet (21 July 1632 – 9 January 1689) was an English politician and baronet.

Born at Fyling Hall, near Whitby in Yorkshire, he was the second son of Sir Hugh Cholmeley, 1st Baronet and his wife Elizabeth Twysden, daughter of Sir William Twysden, 1st Baronet and Anne Finch. Cholmeley succeeded his nephew as baronet in 1665. and was afterwards appointed Governor of Tangier in Morocco by King Charles II of England. From February to August 1679, he was a Member of Parliament (MP) for Northampton, and from 1685 to 1687 for Thirsk.

On 19 February 1665, Cholmeley married Lady Anne Compton, oldest daughter of Spencer Compton, 2nd Earl of Northampton  and Mary Beaumont at Hamerton in Huntingdonshire. They had a daughter, but no son, so with his death the baronetcy became extinct.

Cholmeley was described by Samuel Pepys, as a 'fine, worthy and well-disposed gentleman' with a seeming frustration for the Monarchy. In 1663, in partnership with John Lawson and the Earl of Teviot, then governor of Tangier, he set about the building of a mole harbour, of which he became ultimately the sole contractor. He based the construction in Tangier, on his experiences with the pier at Whitby.

References

1632 births
1689 deaths
Baronets in the Baronetage of England
People from the Borough of Scarborough
Hugh
People in English Tangier
English MPs 1679
English MPs 1685–1687
Soldiers of the Tangier Garrison
Cholmeley baronets